Swarajati is a form in Carnatic music, which is helpful before learning a varnam. It has pallavi, sometimes an anupallavi, and at least one charanam. The themes of swarajathis are usually either bhakthi, love or courage. It is a composition which usually has a pleasing melody and are suitable for singing in early lessons, musical concerts and dance concerts. The most popular and the oldest known Swarajathi is in Huseni raga, hau re raa bhagaya in Telugu by Melattur Veerabhadrayya. Swarajatis have been composed in numerous raagas - Bilahari, Hamsadhwani, Kalyani, Janjuti, Kamas, etc.

References

Carnatic music terminology